Che Mian (born April 27, 1983) is a Paralympic athlete from China competing mainly in category T36 sprint events.

He competed in the 2004 Summer Paralympics in Athens, Greece.  There he won a silver medal in the men's 4 x 100 metre relay - T35-38 event, a silver medal in the men's 4 x 400 metre relay - T35-38 event, a bronze medal in the men's 100 metres - T36 event, finished sixth in the men's 200 metres - T36 event and finished fourth in the men's 400 metres - T36 event.  He also competed at the 2008 Summer Paralympics in Beijing, China.  There he won a silver medal in the men's 4 x 100 metre relay - T35-38 event, a bronze medal in the men's 200 metres - T36 event, a bronze medal in the men's 400 metres - T36 event and finished sixth in the men's 100 metres - T36 event

External links
 

Paralympic athletes of China
Athletes (track and field) at the 2004 Summer Paralympics
Athletes (track and field) at the 2008 Summer Paralympics
Paralympic silver medalists for China
Paralympic bronze medalists for China
Chinese male sprinters
1983 births
Living people
Medalists at the 2004 Summer Paralympics
Medalists at the 2008 Summer Paralympics
Paralympic medalists in athletics (track and field)
21st-century Chinese people
Paralympic sprinters
Medalists at the 2010 Asian Para Games